Aston Manor Academy (formerly Aston Manor School) is a coeducational secondary school and sixth form with academy status, located in the Aston area of Birmingham, England.

Due in part to the fact that it is situated in Aston, it has children from a wide variety of ethnic groups. As of February 2013 the highest proportion of children at the school are of Bangladeshi origin at 33%, with Pakistani at 18%, Black Somali at 13%, Black Caribbean at 11%, Black African at 6% and White British at 3%. A very high proportion do not speak English as their first language. Reflecting the cultural diversity within the school, the school has its own steel band.

In addition to having Technology College status, the Academy has gained a range of awards and accreditations, including Applied Learning, School Achievement, Healthy Schools and International School awards. In May 2011, the Academy gained the Naace Information and Communications Technology (ICT) Mark.

Alumni
 Saido Berahino, professional footballer
 Rekeem Harper, professional footballer
 Leon Edwards, professional Mixed Martial Artist, current UFC Welterweight
 Recordo Gordon, cricketer
 Ateeq Javid, cricketer

References

3. Home | Aston Manor Academy

4. Instagram: aston.manor.academy

Academies in Birmingham, West Midlands
Secondary schools in Birmingham, West Midlands